Settle Junction railway station was located near the town of Settle, North Yorkshire, England, immediately to south of the junction between the Midland Railway's North Western and Settle-Carlisle branches,  northwest of .

History
However, the expected traffic failed to materialise and after just one year of operation, it was closed on 1 November 1877.

Stationmaster
W. Jenkins was installed as the first station master in 1876 but only served one year until 2 November 1877, when the station management was placed under the direct supervision of Long Preston.

The site today

Little trace of the station remains today, although the station house survived in private ownership until well after nationalisation of the railways in 1948, finally succumbing to demolition in the late 1960s. Settle Junction signal box (a Midland Railway timber structure dating from 1913) is still operational and can easily be seen from the adjacent A65, which runs alongside the railway at this point. The box houses a London Midland Region standard frame of 31 levers and controls the busy double junction (which was rebuilt following a derailment in 1979) between the two lines, as well as the block sections toward  to the south, Blea Moor Sidings to the north and  Station Junction to the north west.

Network Rail has acknowledged the performance issues this can cause in its 2008 Lancashire and Cumbria Route Utilisation Strategy and hopes to install additional signalling along the route at some point in the future to address the problem.

Notes

References

Binns, D. (1982), The Scenic Settle & Carlisle Railway, Wyvern Publications, Skipton.

Bibliography

Flinders, T.G. (1981), On The Settle-Carlisle Route, Ian Allan Ltd, Shepperton, Surrey.

External links

RAILSCOT - Settle Junction Gallery
Another photo of the Settle Junction signal box

Rail junctions in England
Disused railway stations in North Yorkshire
Former Midland Railway stations
Railway stations in Great Britain opened in 1876
Railway stations in Great Britain closed in 1877
Settle, North Yorkshire